Thunder is the sound of the shock wave produced by lightning.

Thunder may also refer to:

Computing
Thunder (assistive technology), a screen reader
Thunder Networking Technologies, a Chinese multimedia and Internet company
Thunder, the codename for Microsoft Visual Basic 1.0

Film and television
Thunder the Dog, star of a series of feature films during the 1920s
Thunder (TV series), an American children's television series
Thunder (1929 film), an American silent drama film
Thunder (1982 film), a Japanese experimental short film
Thunder Warrior (also known as Thunder), a 1983 Italian action film
Thunder (2022 film), a Swiss drama film
The Thunder (TV series), a 2019 Chinese web television series

Fictional characters
Thunder (comics), the name of three superheroes in the DC Comics universe
Thunder, a Legion of Super-Heroes member
Thunder (G.I. Joe), a character from the G.I. Joe universe
Thunder (Killer Instinct), a character from the video game Killer Instinct
T.H.U.N.D.E.R. Agents, a team of superheroes, originating with Tower Comics

Military
JF-17 Thunder, an advanced multirole fighter aircraft developed by China and Pakistan
HMS Thunder (1855), an Aetna-class ironclad floating battery
HMS Thunder, a list of other so named Royal Navy ships
USS Thunder (1862), a blockade running steamer of the US Navy

Music
Thunder (band), an English rock band

Albums
Thunder (Andy Taylor album) (1987)
Thunder (SMV album) (2008)

Songs
 "Thunder" (Boys Like Girls song) (2008)
 "Thunder" (East 17 song) (1995)
 "Thunder" (Imagine Dragons song) (2017)
 "Thunder" (Jessie J song) (2013)
 "Thunder" (Leona Lewis song) (2015)
 "Thunder" (Prince song) (1991)
 "Thunder" (Gabry Ponte, Lum!x and Prezioso song), a song by Italian DJ Gabry Ponte (2021)
 "Thunder", a song by Chloe x Halle from Sugar Symphony
 "Thunder", a song by the Prodigy from Invaders Must Die

People
Thunder (luchador) (1981–2016), Australian professional wrestler
Thunder (singer) (born 1990), of South Korean boy band MBLAQ
Jushin Thunder Liger (born 1964), Japanese professional wrestler
 Thunder, a member of the TV show American Gladiators

Sports

Teams
Lancashire Thunder, an English women's cricket team
Manchester Thunder, an English netball team
Minnesota Thunder, a soccer team in the USL First Division
New Orleans Thunder, a professional American football team in 1999
Newcastle Thunder, an English rugby league club
North West Thunder, an English women's cricket team
Oklahoma City Thunder, a basketball team in the National Basketball Association
Quad City Thunder, a basketball team in the Continental Basketball Association
Seattle Thunder, an American women's gridiron football team
Seoul Samsung Thunders, a South Korean pro basketball team
Sydney Thunder, a cricket team in the Big Bash League
Trenton Thunder, a minor league baseball team in New Jersey
Toshiba Kawasaki Brave Thunders, a Japanese basketball team
Wichita Thunder, an ice hockey team in the Central Hockey League

Other
Thunder (mascot), the mascot for the Denver Broncos
Thunder, a former mascot of the Golden State Warriors NBA basketball team
Thunder on the Ohio, a hydroplane boat race held at Evansville, Indiana, on the Ohio River

Other uses
Ar-Ra'd, "The Thunder",  13th sura of the Qur'an
Dr. Thunder, a brand of soda
Fort Thunder, a former venue for underground music events in Providence, Rhode Island
Thunder (play), Russian drama written in 1859
Thunder Over Louisville, a fireworks show
The Thunder, Perfect Mind, a Gnostic work
Triple Action Thunder, a pistol
WCW Thunder, a professional wrestling show
Thunder (ship), an outlaw trawler

See also
 Thunders (disambiguation)
Castle Thunder (disambiguation)
God of Thunder (disambiguation)
Inazuma (disambiguation)
Lightning (disambiguation)
Rolling Thunder (disambiguation)
Thunder Bay (disambiguation)
Thunder god
Thunderer (disambiguation)
Thunderclap (disambiguation)
Thunderbolt (disambiguation)
Thunderstorm
Thundarr the Barbarian